Henry Slater may refer to:
Henry Slater (cricketer, born 1839) (1839–1905), English cricketer
Henry Slater (cricketer, born 1855) (1855–1916), English cricketer
Henry Slater (MP), Member of Parliament (MP) for Portsmouth
Henry H. Slater (1851–1934), English clergyman and naturalist
Henry Slater, character in The Pagan

See also
Harry Slater (disambiguation)
Henry Slate (1910–1996), American actor
Henry Slatter (1830–1902), British trade union leader